The Republican Party was a political party in the Philippines. It was founded by Gregorio Aglipay, the first Supreme Bishop of the Philippine Independent Church.

Gregorio Aglipay founded the party in 1905. It was subsequently banned by the United States Insular Government. In the 1935 presidential election, Aglipay revived the Republican Party, and was supported by the Coalition of the Oppressed Masses. This coalition originally included Emilio Aguinaldo and his National Socialist Party, but Aguinaldo split from the party and launched his own presidential campaign. Aglipay's party had connections with labor unions in Manila.

Aglipay's running mate was Manila councilor Norberto Nabong. Nabong was one of the founding members of the Partido Komunista ng Piilpinas, which was part of the Coalition of the Oppressed Masses. Nabong ran for vice president while being imprisoned. Aglipay's platform consisted of, among others, Philippine independence, land reforms, Filipinization of industries and recognizing Tagalog as the national language of the Philippines. Aglipay and Nabong were defeated by the Nacionalista Party's Manuel L. Quezon and Sergio Osmeña, respectively. Aglipay sent a congratulatory message to Quezon two days after the election when the results became apparent; a day later, he announced, on behalf of the party, that electoral fraud had been committed, thereby seeking to void the election, and proposing that a new election be held. However, the party was eventually dissolved months following the election and Aglipay later focused on his clerical duties in his church until his death in 1940.

Election Results

References 

1905 establishments in the Philippines
Defunct political parties in the Philippines
Political parties established in 1905